The Cape Cod Freedoms were a professional ice hockey team in South Yarmouth, Massachusetts. They also played games in Manchester, New Hampshire and Concord, New Hampshire and were known as the New Hampshire Freedoms. They were a member of the Northeastern Hockey League in the 1978-79 season. They played their home games in the Cape Cod Coliseum, John F. Kennedy Memorial Coliseum and Everett Arena.

References

Defunct ice hockey teams in the United States
1978 establishments in New Hampshire
1979 disestablishments in Massachusetts
Sports in Concord, New Hampshire
Sports in Manchester, New Hampshire
Eastern Hockey League (1978–1981) teams
Boston Bruins minor league affiliates